Northwest Stanwood is a census-designated place (CDP) in Snohomish County, Washington, United States. The population was 149 at the 2010 census. The CDP was known as North Stanwood prior to the 2010 census, and it included area that is now part of the city of Stanwood.

Geography
Northwest Stanwood is located at  (48.256234, -122.350369).

According to the United States Census Bureau, the CDP has a total area of 2.2 square miles (5.8 km2), all of it land.

Demographics
As of the census of 2000, there were 468 people, 172 households, and 125 families residing in the CDP. The population density was 207.8 people per square mile (80.3/km2). There were 179 housing units at an average density of 79.5/sq mi (30.7/km2). The racial makeup of the CDP was 95.73% White, 0.64% Native American, 1.28% Asian, 0.21% Pacific Islander, and 2.14% from two or more races. Hispanic or Latino of any race were 2.56% of the population.

There were 172 households, out of which 36.6% had children under the age of 18 living with them, 64.0% were married couples living together, 6.4% had a female householder with no husband present, and 27.3% were non-families. 23.3% of all households were made up of individuals, and 9.9% had someone living alone who was 65 years of age or older. The average household size was 2.72 and the average family size was 3.24.

In the CDP, the age distribution of the population shows 28.8% under the age of 18, 5.3% from 18 to 24, 27.4% from 25 to 44, 25.2% from 45 to 64, and 13.2% who were 65 years of age or older. The median age was 40 years. For every 100 females, there were 101.7 males. For every 100 females age 18 and over, there were 103.0 males.

The median income for a household in the CDP was $58,194, and the median income for a family was $65,139. Males had a median income of $40,179 versus $35,469 for females. The per capita income for the CDP was $24,128. None of the families and 1.6% of the population were living below the poverty line, including no under eighteens and none of those over 64.

References

Census-designated places in Snohomish County, Washington
Census-designated places in Washington (state)